The 2008 ICC World Twenty20 Qualifier was the inaugural tournament of ICC World Twenty20 Qualifier and was played between 2 and 5 August 2008 in Stormont, Belfast in Northern Ireland. The top three played in the 2009 ICC World Twenty20, the international championship of Twenty20 cricket. The six competing teams were: Bermuda, Canada, Ireland, Kenya, The Netherlands and Scotland.

The competition was won by Ireland and the Netherlands, who shared the trophy after rain forced the final to be abandoned without a ball bowled. Both teams qualified for the 2009 ICC World Twenty20 finals in England. After the withdrawal of Zimbabwe from the competition, the two finalists were joined by third-placed Scotland who eliminated Kenya.

Group stage

Group A

Group B

Knockout stage

Bracket

Semi-finals

Finals

3rd Place Playoff

5th Place playoff

The Final

Final standings

 Qualified for the 2009 ICC World Twenty20.

References

External links
 Tournament overview from Cricinfo
 Tournament overview from CricketArchive
 Tournament overview from CricketEurope

2008 in Irish cricket
International cricket competitions in 2008
2008
2009 ICC World Twenty20